Rose Allwood Morrison (born 21 November 1952) is a Jamaican sprinter. She competed in the 100 metres at the 1972, 1976 and the 1980 Summer Olympics.

References

External links
 

1952 births
Living people
Athletes (track and field) at the 1972 Summer Olympics
Athletes (track and field) at the 1976 Summer Olympics
Athletes (track and field) at the 1980 Summer Olympics
Jamaican female sprinters
Olympic athletes of Jamaica
Athletes (track and field) at the 1971 Pan American Games
Athletes (track and field) at the 1979 Pan American Games
Pan American Games silver medalists for Jamaica
Pan American Games medalists in athletics (track and field)
Athletes (track and field) at the 1974 British Commonwealth Games
Commonwealth Games competitors for Jamaica
Medalists at the 1979 Pan American Games
Olympic female sprinters
20th-century Jamaican women
21st-century Jamaican women